Dichomeris illucescens is a moth in the family Gelechiidae. It was described by Edward Meyrick in 1918. It is found in Assam, India.

The forewings are rather dark brown, with a slight violet tinge and with faint small hardly darker spots above and below the fold at one-fifth. The stigmata is cloudy, obscurely darker, the plical somewhat before the first discal, the first discal rather large, the second transverse. There is a faintly paler cloudy subterminal shade, as well as indistinct marginal dark fuscous dots around the apex and termen. The hindwings are ochreous whitish, the dorsum tinged grey and the apex and upper part of the termen suffused grey.

References

Moths described in 1918
illucescens